The 2012 Vintage Yachting Games was the second post-Olympic multi-class sailing event for discontinued Olympic classes. The event was held on 7–14 July 2012 on Lake Como in Italy. The organization of this event was in the hands of the Multilario, a joint venture of local yacht clubs at Lake Como. The Vintage Yachting Games Organization (VYGO) was the governing organization.
A total of 225 sailors in 113 boats from 17 countries competed in seven Vintage Yachting Classes

Prologue

Bid process
Multilario as organizer was chosen after a bidding process in the summer of 2008. The two other contestants were Yacht Club Cannes for the Mediterranean and Hungarian Yachting Federation for Lake Balaton.
Multilario responded enthusiastic on the request of Alberto Barenghi, President of the International Flying Dutchman Class Organization and chairman of the Vintage Yachting Games Organization's Supervisory board, for candidate Lake Como as host for the 2012 Vintage Yachting Games and submitted an extensive proposal based on the bidding template to the Vintage Yachting Games Organization. It was this proposal the voting classes based their vote on.

Only one voting round was needed to determine the 2012 Vintage Yachting Games location. In the voting process the Vintage Olympic Classes of 2008 each class could cast one vote and each vote counted as one.
The potential 2012 classes could also each cast one vote but the outcome of the potential classes counted as one in the total.

The outcome of the voting was:
 : 4
 : 0
 : 2

Kick-off and preparation
The Kick-off for the 2012 Vintage Yachting Games project was given on Sunday 17 May 2009 in Gravedona, Italy, during a dinner at the Associazione Velica Alto Lario. Present were the management of the Vintage Yachting Games Organization and Multilario.

A yearly meeting was held between the Vintage Yachting Games Organization and Multilario to evaluate the progress of the preparation.

Vintage

Organization

Venues 

For the 2012 Vintage Yachting Games several venues were used to cater for the several Vintage Yachting Classes. 
 Bellano
 Dervio
 Santa Cecilia Harbour in Dervio
All of them located on the east coats of the Northern part of Lake Como, Italy.

Wind conditions 
The Northern part of Lake Como was reportedly a thermic wind venue. In this time of year the normal situation is that at about 13:00 the Swiss mountains are heated up and a Southern wind hits the racing areas with about 10 to 14 knots. As result of this no races were scheduled in the morning.
Unfortunately during the event the temperature was low in Switzerland during the Vintage. As result the actual wind did not came above the 8 knots during the races.

Calendar 
The program of the 2012 Vintage Yachting Games was as follows:

Competition 

Rolf Bähr: Multiple World Champion Tempest, President German National Sailing Authority
Stuart H. Walker: Olympic participant 1968, rear president of the International Soling Class, successful lifetime regatta sailor and author of many books on sailing and winning. Oldest participant during the 2012 Vintage
Johannes Alvarez: Youngest participant during the 2012 Vintage

Continents 
 Africa
 Europe
 North America
 South America

Countries

Vintage Yachting Classes

Measurement
Measurement during the Vintage Yachting Games was limited to new sails and safety equipment of the competing boats. Sails, rigging and boats used in the previous year at Continental and World championships was only "stamped".
No major measurement issues were found.

Opening ceremony 
Due to the fact of three locations: Bellano, Dervio and Santa Cecilia harbor, it was not possible to have the original planned fleet review. As alternative a fanfare followed by a long parade of sailors and organizers walked from the Dervio city hall to the Vintage meeting point near the waterfront. There the opening ceremony of the 2012 Vintage Yachting Games took place. Besides the Italian National Anthem two choirs of Italian Opera singers sung Va, pensiero from Verdi during the flag hoisting procedure. Furthermore there were short speeches from The Vintage Yachting Games Organization, the representatives of Bellano and Dervio, the organizing clubs and the Italian Sailing Federation. Finally Alberto Barenghi, president of the International Flying Dutchman Organization and chairman of the Vintage Yachting Games supervisory board declared the games opened.

Closing ceremony
The closing ceremony started with the Vintage InterPares race in the 12' Dinghies. This was followed by the prize giving with the team of father and daughter Maccari as presentation duo.

During the closing of the event Rudy den Outer handed over stainless remembrance plates with the Vintage logo to the cities of Bellano and Dervio. He also announced that "Weymouth and Portland National Sailing Academy", host of this year's Olympic sailing regatta, will be the host of the 2016 Vintage Yachting Games. After that the Vintage flag was received from Pietro Adamoli and Carlo Bossi, representing the Multilario organization. The flag was subsequently handed over to John Best representing Great Britain as the next host country.

Media coverage
The official photographer of the 2012 Vintage Yachting Games was Silvio Sandonini.

The following footage is available on YouTube:
 From spectator Soling I-12: Soling Leeward mark rounding 5th race
 From spectator Soling I-12: Mark Round 5th race Soling
 From Dragon NED 402: Race 3 aboard Team Bakker3

Sailing 
Races in all events were sailed in a fleet racing format of nine scheduled races. The contestants raced around a course in one group, and each boat earned a score equal conform the bonus point system. The five best scores for each boat were summed up for the overall score. Due to wind conditions not all scheduled races could be sailed.

Reports per event
Per class separate pages reporting the facts are available (see the details section per class in the medals table).

Report Vintage InterPares race

By crossing an Italian colored ribbon Yevhen Braslavets, the responsible person of the victorious Ukrainian Dragon Bunker Prince, won the Vintage InterPares race 2012. In this race all winners of the Vintage Yachting Games meet each other in a battle between the classes. This race is held in the 12' Dinghy, an Olympic class in 1920 and 1928. This class is still very active in 10 countries including The Netherlands, Italy and Japan. For privacy reasons the rest of the finishing order will remain a secret. The International Dragon Class will be "THE" Vintage Yachting Class for the next four years.

Medal summary

Medals

Vintage 2012

Vintage 2008 - 2012

Country Trophy

References

Information about the Vintage Yachting Classes (former Olympic classes) can be verified by the:
 International Olympic Committee: IOC
 International Sailing Federation: ISAF
 Newport Harbor Nautical Museum: Newport Harbor Nautical Museum
 Nederlands Scheepvaartmuseum Amsterdam : Scheepvaartmuseum
and
 
Information about the organization, conditions, sailors and results can be verified by the:
 Vintage Yachting Games Organization: Vintage Yachting Games
 International Europe Class Union: Europe
 International Twelve Foot Dinghy Class Association: 12' Dinghy
 Olympiajolle Class Union: O-Jolle
 International Flying Dutchman Class Organization: Flying Dutchman
 International Yngling Association: Yngling
 International Tempest Association: Tempest
 International Soling Association: Soling
 International Dragon Association: Dragon
 International 5.5 Class Association: 5.5 Metre

 
2012
Vintage Yachting Games, 2012